Vicki Gabereau (born May 31, 1946) is a Canadian radio and television personality, best known for her longtime association with CBC Radio and her television talk show which aired on CTV from 1997 to 2005.

Biography
Vicki Frances Filion was born in Vancouver. Her father's best friend, author Pierre Berton, was influential in her life, exposing Gabereau to the greatest intellectuals and stars of the 1950s and 1960s.

Gabereau moved to Toronto at age 18 for university. While there she married Michel Gabereau and worked a variety of jobs, including working as a professional clown at Puck Rent-a-Fool. In that capacity, she ran for Mayor of Toronto in the 1974 municipal election under the pseudonym "Rosy Sunrise". She then worked in radio, hosting her first talk show for a station in Brampton, Ontario in 1975. She later joined the CBC as an archivist, and became host of that network's Variety Tonight in 1981.

In 1985, she became host of Gabereau, a two-hour daily interview show on CBC Radio. She was one of the CBC's most popular and beloved hosts until her departure in 1997, when she moved to CTV, for which she hosted a television talk show, The Vicki Gabereau Show, for eight seasons.

Her radio program was replaced in the fall of 1997 by Richardson's Roundup, hosted by Bill Richardson. She published an autobiography, This Won't Hurt a Bit, and a cookbook collecting some of her favourite recipes sent in by her CBC radio listeners.

In 2005, she was named by ACTRA as the recipient of its John Drainie Award for lifetime achievement in Canadian broadcasting.

In 2013, it was announced that a retired Gabereau had partnered with a childhood friend to launch a shoe company called VG Shoes.

She makes regular fundraising appearances on the Knowledge Network and is a three-time ACTRA Award winner for best radio host-interviewer.

She has two children, Morgan Gabereau and Eve Gabereau, a step-daughter and five grandchildren.

References

External links

Gabereau (talk show) - Canadian Communication Foundation

1946 births
Living people
Canadian television talk show hosts
Writers from Vancouver
Writers from Toronto
Canadian clowns
Ontario municipal politicians
CBC Radio hosts
Canadian autobiographers
Canadian talk radio hosts
Canadian women non-fiction writers
Canadian women television hosts
Women autobiographers
CTV Television Network people
Canadian women radio hosts